The small town of Santa Gertrudis lies in the municipality of San Buenaventura in the State of Coahuila, Mexico, with a population of under 200 year-round residents, and under 200 part-time residents. Santa Gertrudis is most populated during the summer or winter months when people that live in bigger cities in Mexico or the United States visit. 

Founded by the Sandoval family, the 200+ year old town has existed since before the battle for Mexican Independence.   
Populated places in Coahuila